A list of chapters of the Phi Mu Delta fraternity as of January 2023.

Active chapters
New England District: 
Nu Beta - University of New Hampshire
Nu Gamma - University of Vermont 
Nu Theta - Rensselaer Polytechnic Institute

Mid-Atlantic District:
Mu Alpha - Susquehanna University
Mu Beta - Ohio Northern University 
Mu Zeta - Lock Haven University of Pennsylvania
Mu Theta - Indiana University of Pennsylvania 
Mu Xi - Pennsylvania College of Technology
Mu Omicron - Frostburg State University
Mu Sigma - Rutgers University–New Brunswick 
Mu Upsilon - Robert Morris University
Mu Chi - Stevenson University (Provisional Chapter)
Mu Psi - Stockton University (Provisional Chapter)
Southern District:
Sigma Alpha - Longwood University

Dormant chapters
New England District:
Nu Alpha - University of Connecticut
Nu Delta - Massachusetts Institute of Technology
Nu Epsilon - University of Maine
Nu Theta Eta - New England College	
Nu Zeta (Original) - Boston University
Nu Zeta - University of Massachusetts Amherst
Nu Eta - University of Rhode Island
Nu Iota – Tufts University
Nu Kappa - New York University
Nu Lambda - Trinity College (CT)
Nu Omicron - Keene State College
Nu Pi - SUNY-Plattsburgh
Nu Xi - University of Southern Maine

Mid-Atlantic District:
Mu Gamma - Ohio State University
Mu Delta - Wittenberg University
Mu Epsilon - Pennsylvania State University
Mu Eta - Kutztown University of Pennsylvania
Mu Iota - Lycoming College
Mu Kappa - Slippery Rock University of Pennsylvania
Mu Lambda - Mansfield University of Pennsylvania
Mu Pi - California University of Pennsylvania
Mu Rho - Shawnee State University 
Mu Tau - Rutgers University–Camden
Mu Omega - University of Toledo

Great Plains District: 
Gamma Alpha - Northwestern University
Gamma Beta - University of Michigan
Gamma Gamma - University of Illinois
Gamma Delta - University of Wisconsin–Madison
Gamma Epsilon - University of Minnesota Morris
Gamma Psi - Tarkio College

Pacific District: 
Pi Alpha - University of California, Berkeley
Pi Beta - Oregon State University

See also
Phi Mu Delta

External links
PhiMuDelta.org

chapters
Lists of chapters of United States student societies by society